Linongot is a traditional dessert among the Kadazan-Dusun peoples in the state of Sabah in  Malaysia. It is made with tapioca flour, sweet potato and tarap/irik leaf.

See also
 List of desserts

References

External links 
 Linongot
 Traditional Recipes - LINONGOT

Malaysian desserts